Tate Jackson (born February 4, 1997) is an American competition swimmer who specializes in sprint freestyle events. He is a two-time gold medalist in the  freestyle relay and  medley relay, and a silver medalist in the 100 m freestyle at the  2019 World University Games. As a collegiate athlete for the University of Texas, Jackson was a two-time NCAA champion, an 11-time All American, a three-time NCAA team champion, and an eight-time Big 12 Conference champion. He is also the current conference and school record-holder in the 100-yard freestyle (41.06). As a professional athlete, Jackson represents the Cali Condors in the International Swimming League. In 2021, he was given a one-month ban for breaking anti-doping regulations.

Personal bests

See also
 NCAA Division I Men's Swimming and Diving Championships
 List of University of Texas at Austin alumni
 Texas Longhorns swimming and diving
 Texas Longhorns

References

External links
 
 Tate Jackson at TexasSports
 Tate Jackson at SwimSwam
 Tate Jackson at CollegeSwimming

1997 births
Living people
American male freestyle swimmers
Universiade medalists in swimming
Universiade gold medalists for the United States
Medalists at the 2019 Summer Universiade
People from Austin, Texas
Sportspeople from Austin, Texas
Texas Longhorns men's swimmers
Doping cases in swimming